European Standards (abbreviated EN, from the German name  ("European Norm")) are technical standards drafted and maintained by CEN (European Committee for Standardization), CENELEC (European Committee for Electrotechnical Standardization) and ETSI (European Telecommunications Standards Institute).

EN 1–999 
 EN 1: Flued oil stoves with vaporizing burners
 EN 2: Classification of fires
 EN 3: Portable fire extinguishers
EN 14: Dimensions of bed blankets
 EN 19: Industrial valves – Marking of metallic valves
EN 20: Wood preservatives.
 EN 26: Gas-fired instantaneous water heaters for the production of domestic hot water
 EN 40-1: Lighting columns - Part 1: Definitions and terms
 EN 40-2: Lighting columns - Part 2: General requirements and dimensions
 EN 40-3-1: Lighting columns - Part 3-1: Design and verification - Specification for characteristic loads
 EN 40-3-2: Lighting columns - Part 3-2: Design and verification - Verification by testing
 EN 40-3-3: Lighting columns - Part 3-3: Design and verification - Verification by calculation
 EN 40-4: Lighting columns - Part 4: Requirements for reinforced and prestressed concrete lighting columns
 EN 40-5: Lighting columns - Part 5: Requirements for steel lighting columns
 EN 40-6: Lighting columns - Part 6: Requirements for aluminium lighting columns
 EN 40-7: Lighting columns - Part 7: Requirements for fibre reinforced polymer composite lighting columns
 EN 54: Fire detection and fire alarm systems
 EN 71: Safety of toys
 EN 81: Safety of lifts
 EN 115: Safety of escalators & Moving walks
 EN 166: Personal eye protection. Specifications
 EN 196: Methods for testing cement (10 parts)
 EN 197-1: Cement – Part 1 : Composition, specifications and conformity criteria for common cements
 EN 197-2: Cement – Part 2 : Conformity evaluation
 EN 206-1: Concrete – Part 1: Specification, performance, production and conformity
 EN 207: Classification and specifications of filters and eye protection against laser
 EN 208: Classification of eye protection filters for laser alignment
 EN 228: Specifications for automotive petrol
 EN 250: Respiratory equipment. Open-circuit self-contained compressed air diving apparatus. Requirements, testing, marking
 EN 280: Mobile elevating work platforms. Design calculations, Stability criteria, Construction, Safety Examinations and tests
 EN 286: Simple unfired pressure vessels designed to contain air or nitrogen
 Part 3: Steel pressure vessels designed for air braking equipment and auxiliary pneumatic equipment for railway rolling stock
 Part 4: Aluminium alloy pressure vessels designed for air braking equipment and auxiliary pneumatic equipment for railway rolling stock
 EN 287: Qualification test of welders — Fusion welding
 Part 1: Steels
 EN 294: Safety of machinery; safety distances to prevent danger zones from being reached by the upper limbs
 EN 298: Automatic gas burner control systems for gas burners and gas burning appliances with or without fans
EN 301 549: European standard for digital accessibility
 EN 336: Structural timber — Sizes, permitted deviations
 EN 338: Structural timber — Strength classes
 EN 341: Personal protective equipment against falls from a height. Descender devices
 EN 352-2: Revised 2002 standards on hearing protectors. Safety requirements and testing, generally about earplugs.
 EN 353-1: Personal protective equipment against falls from a height. Guided type fall arresters including a rigid anchor
 EN 353-2: Personal protective equipment against falls from a height. Guided type fall arresters including a flexible anchor line
 EN 354: Personal protective equipment against falls from a height. Lanyards
 EN 355: Personal protective equipment against falls from a height. Energy absorbers
 EN 358: Personal protective equipment for work positioning and prevention of falls from a height. Belts for work positioning and restraint and work positioning lanyards
 EN 360: Personal protective equipment against falls from a height. Retractable type fall arresters
 EN 361: Personal protective equipment against falls from a height. Full body harnesses
 EN 362: Personal protective equipment against falls from a height. Connectors
 EN 363: Personal protective equipment against falls from a height. Fall arrest systems
 EN 374: Protective gloves against chemicals and micro-organisms
 EN 381: Protective clothing for chainsaw users, e.g. trousers, jackets, gloves, boots/gaiters.
 EN 386: Glued laminated timber - Performance requirements and minimum production requirements
 EN 388: Protective gloves against mechanical risks
 EN 390: Glued laminated timber. Sizes. Permissible deviations
 EN 391: Glued laminated timber - Delamination tests of glue lines
 EN 392: Glued laminated timber - Shear test of glue lines
 EN 397: Specification for industrial safety helmets
 EN 403: Respiratory protective devices for self-rescue. Filtering devices with hood for escape from fire. Requirements, testing, marking.
 EN 408: Structural timber and glued laminated timber — Determination of some physical and mechanical properties
 EN 417: Non-refillable metallic cartridges for liquefied petroleum gases
 EN 420: Protective gloves. General requirements and test methods
 EN 438: Decorative high-pressure laminates (HPL) sheets based on thermosetting resins.
 EN 440: "Welding consumables wire electrodes and deposits for gas shielded metal arc welding of non-alloy and fine grain steel - Classification" (1994)
 EN 450: Fly ash for concrete - Definitions, requirements and quality control
 EN 474: Earth-moving Machinery. Safety. General Requirements
 EN 518: Structural timber. Grading. Requirements for visual strength grading standards   (replaced by EN 14081-1)
 EN 519: Structural timber. Grading. Requirements for machine strength graded timber and grading machines (Replaced by EN 14081-1)
 EN 567: Mountaineering equipment. Rope clamps. Safety requirements and test methods
 EN 590: Specification for automotive diesel
 EN 631: Containers for foodstuffs
 EN 694: Fire-fighting hoses. Semi-rigid hoses for fixed systems
 EN 716: Children's cots and folding cots for domestic use
 EN 795: Protection against falls from a height. Anchor devices. Requirements and testing
 EN 805: Water supply. Requirements for systems and components outside buildings
 EN 813: Personal protective equipment for prevention of falls from a height. Sit harnesses
 EN 837: Pressure connections
 EN 840: Mobile waste containers.
 EN 877: Cast iron pipes and fittings, their joints and accessories for the evacuation of water from buildings. Requirements, test methods and quality assurance
 EN 926-1: Paragliding equipment - Paragliders - Part 1: Requirements and test methods for structural strength
 EN 926-2: Paragliding equipment - Paragliders - Part 2: Requirements and test methods for classifying flight safety characteristics
 EN 933-1: Test for geometrical properties of aggregates - Part 1: determination of particle size distribution - Sieving method
 EN 934-2: Admixtures for concrete, mortar and grout - Part 2: concrete admixtures - Definitions and requirements
 EN 966: Helmets for airborne sports - used in paragliding, hang gliding and flying with ultra-light aeroplanes.
 EN 980: Symbols for use in the labeling of medical devices

EN 1000–1989 
 EN 1010-1: Safety of machinery. Safety requirements for the design and construction of printing and paper converting machines. Common requirements
 EN 1010-2: Safety of machinery. Safety requirements for the design and construction of printing and paper converting machines. Printing and varnishing machines including pre-press machinery
 EN 1010-3: Safety of machinery. Safety requirements for the design and construction of printing and paper converting machines. Cutting machines
 EN 1010-4: Safety of machinery. Safety requirements for the design and construction of printing and paper converting machines. Bookbinding, paper converting and finishing machines
 EN 1010-5: Safety of machinery - Safety requirements for the design and construction of printing and paper converting machines. Machines for the production of corrugated board
 EN 1069: Water slides of 2 m height and more
 EN 1078: Helmets for pedal cyclists and for users of skateboards and roller skates
 EN 1090: Execution of steel structures and aluminium structures (3 parts)
 EN 1092: Flanges and their joints. Circular flanges for pipes, valves, fittings and accessories, PN designated
 EN 1168: Precast concrete products - Hollow core slabs
 EN 1176-1: Playground equipment. General safety requirements and test methods
 EN 1177: Impact absorbing playground surfacing. Safety requirements and test methods
EN 1325:2014: Value Management. Vocabulary. Terms and definitions
EN 1325-1:1997 Value management, value analysis, functional analysis vocabulary. Value analysis and functional analysis (withdrawn, replaced by EN 1325:2014) 
 EN 1337: Structural bearings
 EN 1399: Resilient floor coverings. Determination of resistance to stubbed and burning cigarettes
 EN 1401: Plastics piping systems for non-pressure underground drainage and sewerage - Unplasticized poly(vinyl chloride) (PVC-U)
EN 1466: Child use and care articles - Carry cots and stands - Safety requirements and test methods
 EN 1496: Personal fall protection equipment. Rescue lifting devices
 EN 1679: Reciprocating internal combustion engines: Compression ignition engines
 EN 1809: Diving accessories. Buoyancy compensators. Functional and safety requirements, test methods.
 EN 1815: Resilient and textile floor coverings. Assessment of static electrical propensity
 EN 1846: Firefighting and rescue service vehicles
EN 1888-1: Child use and care articles - Wheeled child conveyances (Part 1: Pushchairs and prams—Up to 15 kg)
EN 1888-2: Child use and care articles - Wheeled child conveyances (Part 2: Pushchairs for children above 15 kg up to 22 kg)
 EN 1891: Personal protective equipment for the prevention of falls from a height. Low stretch kernmantel ropes
 EN 1972: Diving equipment - Snorkels - Requirements and test methods

EN 1990–1999 (Eurocodes)

 EN 1990: (Eurocode 0) Basis of structural design
 EN 1991: (Eurocode 1) Actions on structures
 EN 1992: (Eurocode 2) Design of concrete structures
 EN 1993: (Eurocode 3) Design of steel structures
 EN 1994: (Eurocode 4) Design of composite steel and concrete structures
 EN 1995: (Eurocode 5) Design of timber structures
 EN 1996: (Eurocode 6) Design of masonry structures
 EN 1997: (Eurocode 7) Geotechnical design
 EN 1998: (Eurocode 8) Design of structures for earthquake resistance
 EN 1999: (Eurocode 9) Design of aluminium structures

EN 10000–10999 
This range includes almost exclusively CEN Standards related to iron and steel.

 EN 10002: Metallic Materials - Tensile Testing
 EN 10002-1: Method of Test at Ambient Temperature
 EN 10002-5: Method of testing at elevated temperatures
 EN 10024: Hot rolled taper flange I sections. Tolerances on shape and dimensions
 EN 10025: Hot rolled products of structural steels
EN 10025-1: Part 1: General technical delivery conditions
EN 10025-2: Part 2: Technical delivery conditions for non-alloy structural steels
EN 10025-3: Part 3: Technical delivery conditions for normalized/normalized rolled weldable fine grain structural steels
EN 10025-4: Part 4: Technical delivery conditions for thermomechanical rolled weldable fine grain structural steels
EN 10025-5: Part 5: Technical delivery conditions for structural steels with improved atmospheric corrosion resistance
EN 10025-6:Part 6: Technical delivery conditions for flat products of high yield strength structural steels in the quenched and tempered condition
 EN 10027: Designation systems for steel.
 EN 10088-1 Stainless steels - Part 1: List of stainless steels
EN 10088-2 Stainless steels - Part 2: Technical delivery conditions for sheet/plate and strip of corrosion resisting steels for general purposes
EN 10088-3 Stainless steels - Part 3: Stainless steels - Technical delivery conditions for semi-finished products, bars, rods, wire, sections and bright products of corrosion resisting steels for general purposes
EN 10088-4 Stainless steels - Part 4: Technical delivery conditions for sheet/plate and strip of corrosion resisting steels for construction purposes;
EN 10149: Hot rolled flat products made of high yield strength steels for cold forming.
EN 10149-1: General technical delivery conditions
EN 10149-2: Technical delivery conditions for thermomechanically rolled steels
EN 10149-3: Technical delivery conditions for normalized or normalized rolled steels
EN 10204: Metallic products - Types of inspection documents
 EN 10216: Seamless steel tubes for pressure purposes
EN 10216-1: Part 1: Non-alloy steel tubes with specified room temperature properties
EN 10216-2: Part 2: Non alloy and alloy steel tubes with specified elevated temperature properties
EN 10216-3: Part 3: Alloy fine grain steel tubes
EN 10216-4: Part 4: Non-alloy and alloy steel tubes with specified low temperature properties
EN 10216-5: Part 5: Stainless steel tubes
 EN 10217: Welded steel tubes for pressure purposes
EN 10217-1: Part 1: Non-alloy steel tubes with specified room temperature properties
EN 10217-2: Part 2: Electric welded non-alloy and alloy steel tubes with specified elevated temperature properties
EN 10217-3: Part 3: Alloy fine grain steel tubes
EN 10217-4: Part 4: Electric welded non-alloy steel tubes with specified low temperature properties
 EN 10220: Seamless and welded steel tubes — Dimensions and masses per unit length
 EN 10240: Internal and/or external protective coating for steel tubes - specification for hot dip galvanized coatings applied in automatic plants
 EN 10305: Steel tubes for precision applications — Technical delivery conditions
 Part 4: Seamless cold drawn tubes for hydraulic and pneumatic power systems
 Part 6: Welded cold drawn tubes for hydraulic and pneumatic power systems
EN 12080, Railway applications — Axleboxes — Rolling bearings
EN 10357: Austenitic, austenitic-ferritic and ferritic longitudinally welded stainless steel tubes for the food and chemical industry
 EN 10365: Hot rolled steel channels, I and H sections. Dimensions and masses

EN 11000–19999 
 EN 12102: Air conditioners, liquid chilling packages, heat pumps and dehumidifiers with electrically driven compressors for space heating and cooling - Measurement of airborne noise - Determination of the sound power level
 EN 12103: Resilient floor coverings - Agglomerated cork underlays - specification
 EN 12104: Resilient floor coverings - Cork floor tiles - Specification
 EN 12105: Resilient floor coverings - Determination of moisture content of agglomerated composition cork
 EN 12199: Resilient floor coverings. Specifications for homogeneous and heterogeneous relief rubber floor coverings
 EN 12221: Changing units for domestic use
 EN 12246: Quality classification of timber used in pallets and packaging
 EN 12255: Wastewater treatment plants
EN 12255-1: Part 1: General construction principles
EN 12255-2: Part 2: Performance requirements of raw wastewater pumping installations
EN 12255-3: Part 3: Preliminary treatment
EN 12255-4: Part 4: Primary settlement
EN 12255-5: Part 5: Lagooning processes
EN 12255-6: Part 6: Activated sludge process
EN 12255-7: Part 7: Biological fixed-film reactors
EN 12255-8: Part 8: Sludge treatment and storage
EN 12255-9: Part 9: Odour control and ventilation
EN 12255-10: Part 10: Safety principles
EN 12255-11: Part 11: General data required
EN 12255-12: Part 12: Control and automation
EN 12255-13: Part 13: Chemical treatment - Treatment of wastewater by precipitation/flocculation
EN 12255-14: Part 14: Disinfection
EN 12255-15: Part 15: Measurement of the oxygen transfer in clean water in aeration tanks of activated sludge plants
EN 12255-16: Part 16: Physical (mechanical) filtration
 EN 12277: Mountaineering and climbing harnesses
 EN 12281: Printing and business paper. Requirements for copy paper.
 EN 12345: Welding. Multilingual terms for welded joints with illustrations
 EN 12492: Helmets for mountaineering
 EN 12566: Small wastewater treatment systems for up to 50 PT
EN 12566-1: Part 1: Prefabricated septic tanks
EN 12566-2: Part 2: Soil infiltration systems
EN 12566-3: Part 3: Packaged and/or site assembled domestic wastewater treatment plants
EN 12566-4: Part 4: Septic tanks assembled in situ from prefabricated kits
EN 12566-5: Part 5: Pretreated Effluent Filtration systems
EN 12566-6: Part 6: Prefabricated treatment units for septic tank effluent
EN 12566-7: Part 7: Prefabricated tertiary treatment units
 EN 12572: Artificial climbing structures
 EN 12600: Classification of Resistance of Glazing to Impact
 EN 12663: Railway applications - Structural requirements of railway vehicle bodies
 Part 1: Locomotives and passenger rolling stock (and alternative method for freight wagons)
 Part 2: Freight wagons
 EN 12797: Brazing – Destructive tests of brazed joints
 EN 12799: Brazing – Non-destructive examination brazed joints
 EN 12810: Facade scaffolds made of prefabricated parts
 EN 12811: Temporary works equipment
 EN 12841: Personal fall protection equipment. Rope access systems. Rope adjustment devices
BS EN 12845:2015+A1:2019 Fixed firefighting systems. Automatic sprinkler systems. Design, installation and maintenance, as amended 2019 
 EN 12890: Patterns, pattern equipment and coreboxes for the production of sand molds and sand cores
 EN 12952: Water-Tube Boilers and Auxiliary Installations
 EN 12973: Value Management
 EN 12975-1: Thermal solar systems and components - Solar collectors
 EN 13000: Cranes - Mobile Cranes
 EN 13103: Railway applications — Wheelsets and bogies — Non-powered axles — Design method
 EN 13104: Railway applications — Wheelsets and bogies — Powered axles — Design method
 EN 13133: "Brazing - Brazer approval" (2000)
 EN 13145: Railway applications - Track - Wood sleepers and bearers
 EN 13146: Railway applications - Track - Test methods for fastening systems
 EN 13146-1: Part 1: Determination of longitudinal rail restraint
 EN 13146-2: Part 2: Determination of torsional resistance
 EN 13146-3: Part 3: Determination of attenuation of impact loads
 EN 13146-4: Part 4: Effect of repeated loading
 EN 13146-5: Part 5: Determination of electrical resistance
 EN 13146-6: Part 6: Effect of severe environmental conditions
 EN 13146-7: Part 7: Determination of clamping force
 EN 13146-8: Part 8: In service testing
 EN 13146-9: Part 9: Determination of stiffness
 EN 13162:2013-03: Thermal insulation products for buildings - Factory made mineral wool (MW) products 
 EN 13204: Double acting hydraulic rescue tools for fire and rescue service use. Safety and performance requirements
 EN 13231: Railway applications - Track - Acceptance of works
 EN 13231-1: Part 1: Works on ballasted track - Plain line, switches and crossings
 EN 13231-2: Part 2: Acceptance of reprofiling rails in plain line, switches, crossings, and expansion devices
 EN 13231-3: withdrawn, replaced by EN 13231-2
 EN 13231-4: withdrawn, replaced by EN 13231-2
 EN 13231-5: Part 5: Procedures for rail reprofiling in plain line, switches, crossings, and expansion devices
 EN 13260: Railway applications — Wheelsets and bogies — Wheelsets — Product requirements
 EN 13261: Railway applications — Wheelsets and bogies — Axles — Product requirements
 EN 13262: Railway applications — Wheelsets and bogies — Wheels — Product requirements
 EN 13300: quality and classification of (interior) wall paint
 EN 13309: Construction machinery - Electromagnetic compatibility of machines with internal power supply
 EN 13319: Diving accessories. Depth gauges and combined depth and time measuring devices. Functional and safety requirements, test methods.
 EN 13402: Size designation of clothes
 EN 13432: Compostable and biodegradable packaging
 EN 13445: Unfired pressure vessels
 EN 13480: Metallic industrial piping
 EN 13501: Fire classification of construction products and building elements
 EN 13537: Temperature ratings for sleeping bags
 EN 13594:2002: Protective gloves for professional motorcycle riders. Requirements and test methods
 EN 13595-1:2002: Protective clothing for professional motorcycle riders. Jackets, trousers and one piece or divided suits. General requirements
 EN 13595-2:2002: Protective clothing for professional motorcycle riders. Jackets, trousers and one piece or divided suits. Test method for determination of impact abrasion resistance
 EN 13595-3:2002: Protective clothing for professional motorcycle riders. Jackets, trousers and one piece or divided suits. Test method for determination of burst strength.
 EN 13595-4:2002: Protective clothing for professional motorcycle riders. Jackets, trousers and one piece or divided suits. Test methods for the determination of impact cut resistance
 EN 13612: Performance evaluation of in-vitro diagnostic devices
 EN 13634: Protective footwear for professional motorcycle riders. Requirements and test methods
 EN 13640: Stability testing of in vitro diagnostic reagents
 EN 13749 Railway applications — Wheelsets and bogies — Method of specifying the structural requirements of bogie frames
 EN 13757: Communication system for meters and remote reading of meters (Meter-Bus)
 EN 13803: Railway applications - Track - Track alignment design parameters - Track gauges 1435 mm and wider
 EN 13940:2016: System of concepts to support continuity of care
 EN 13979: Railway applications — Wheelsets and bogies — Monobloc wheels — Technical approval procedure
 Part 1: Forged and rolled wheels
 EN ISO 13982: Protective clothing for use against solid particulates
 Part 1: Performance requirements for chemical protective clothing providing protection to the full body against airborne solid particulates (type 5 clothing)
 EN 14033: Railway applications — Track — Railbound construction and maintenance machines
 Part 1: Technical requirements for running
 Part 2: Technical requirements for travelling and working
 Part 3: General safety requirements
 EN 14067: Railway applications — Aerodynamics
 Part 1: Symbols and units
 Part 3: Aerodynamics in tunnels
 Part 4: Requirements and test procedures for aerodynamics on open track
 Part 5: Requirements and test procedures for aerodynamics in tunnels
 Part 6: Requirements and test procedures for cross wind assessment
 EN 14081: Timber structures - Strength graded structural timber with rectangular cross section
 Part 1: General requirements
 Part 2: Machine grading - additional requirements for initial type testing.
 Part 3: Machine grading - additional requirements for factory production control.
 Part 4: Machine grading - grading machine settings for machine controlled systems.
 EN 14214: The pure biodiesel standard
 EN 14225-1: Diving suits. Wet suits. Requirements and test methods.
 EN 14225-2: Diving suits. Dry suits. Requirements and test methods.
 EN 14363: Railway applications — Testing and Simulation for the acceptance of running characteristics of railway vehicles — Running Behaviour and stationary tests
 EN 14450:2018 Secure storage units - Requirements, classification and methods of test for resistance to burglary - Secure safe cabinets
 EN 14511: Air conditioners, liquid chilling packages and heat pumps with electrically driven compressors for space heating and cooling
 EN 14531: Railway applications — Methods for calculation of stopping and slowing distances and immobilization braking
 Part 1: General algorithms utilizing mean value calculation for train sets or single vehicles
 Part 2: Step by step calculations for train sets or single vehicles
 EN 14535: Railway applications — Brake discs for railway rolling stock
 Part 1: Brake discs pressed or shrunk onto the axle or drive shaft, dimensions and quality requirements
 Part 2: Brake discs mounted onto the wheel, dimensions and quality requirements
 EN 14601: Railway applications — Straight and angled end cocks for brake pipe and main reservoir pipe
 EN 14904: Surfaces for sports areas. Indoor surfaces for multi-sports use. Specification
 EN 14988: Children's High chairs
 Part 1: Safety requirements
 Part 2: Test methods
 EN 15152: Railway applications — Front windscreens for train cabs
 EN 15153: Railway applications — External visible and audible warning devices
 Part 1: Head, marker and tail lamps
 Part 2: Warning horns
 EN 15179: Railway applications — Braking — Requirements for the brake system of coaches
 EN 15220: Railway applications — Brake indicators
 EN 15227: Railway applications — Crashworthiness requirements for railway vehicle bodies
 EN 15251: Indoor environmental input parameters for design and assessment of energy performance of buildings- addressing indoor air quality, thermal environment, lighting and acoustics
EN 15273: Railway applications - Gauges
 Part 1: General - Common rules for infrastructure and rolling stock
 Part 2: Rolling stock gauge
 Part 3: Structure gauges
 EN 15313: Railway applications — In-service wheelset operation requirements — In-service and off-vehicle wheelset maintenance
 EN 15329: Railway applications — Braking — Brake block holder and brake shoe key for railway vehicles
 EN 15355: Railway applications — Braking — Distributor valves and distributor-isolating devices
 EN 15427 Railway applications - Wheel/Rail friction management
 Part 1-1: Equipment and Application – Flange lubrication
 Part 1-2: Equipment and Application – Top of Rail materials
 Part 1-3: Equipment and Application – Adhesion materials
 Part 2-1: Properties and Characteristics – Flange lubricants
 Part 2-2: Properties and Characteristics – Top of Rail materials
 Part 2-3: Properties and Characteristics – Adhesion materials
 EN 15437: Railway applications — Axlebox condition monitoring — Interface and design requirements
 Part 1: Track side equipment and rolling stock axlebox
 EN 15528: Railway applications — Line categories for managing the interface between load limits of vehicles and infrastructure
 EN 15531: Service Interface for Real Time Information
 EN 15551: Railway applications — Railway rolling stock — Buffers
 EN 15566: Railway applications — Railway rolling stock — Draw gear and screw coupling
 EN 15595: Railway applications - Braking - Wheel slide protection
 EN 15610: Railway applications - Acoustics - Rail and wheel roughness measurement related to noise generation
 EN 15611: Railway applications — Braking — Relay valves
 EN 15612: Railway applications — Braking — Brake pipe accelerator valve
 EN 15624: Railway applications — Braking — Empty-loaded changeover devices
 EN 15625: Railway applications — Braking — Automatic variable load sensing devices
 EN 15663: Railway applications — Definition of vehicle reference masses
 EN 15714: Industrial Valves - Actuators
 EN 15744: Film identification — Minimum set of metadata for cinematographic works
 EN 15806: Railway applications — Braking — Static brake testing
 EN 15807: Railway applications — Pneumatic half couplings
 EN 15827: Railway applications — Requirements for bogies and running gears
 EN 15838: Customer Contact Centres - Requirements for service provision
 EN 15839: Railway applications — Testing for the acceptance of running characteristics of railway vehicles — Freight wagons — Testing of running safety under longitudinal compressive forces
 EN 15877: Railway applications — Marking on railway vehicles
 Part 1: Freight wagons
 Part 2: External markings on coaches, motive power units, locomotives and on track machines
 EN 15883: Washer-disinfectors
 EN 15907: Film identification — Enhancing interoperability of metadata - Element sets and structures
 EN 16001: Energy management systems; withdrawn, replaced by ISO 50001
 EN 16034: Pedestrian doorsets, industrial, commercial, garage doors and openable windows. Product standard, performance characteristics. Fire resisting and/or smoke control characteristics
 EN 16114: Management consultancy services
 EN 16207: Railway applications — Braking — Functional and performance criteria of Magnetic Track Brake systems for use in railway rolling stock
 EN 16228: Drilling and foundation equipment – Safety
 EN 16228-1: Common requirements
 EN 16228-2: Mobile drill rigs for civil and geotechnical engineering, quarrying and mining
 EN 16228-3: Horizontal directional drilling equipment (HDD)
 EN 16228-4: Foundation equipment
 EN 16228-5: Diaphragm walling equipment
 EN 16228-6: Jetting, grouting and injection equipment
 EN 16228-7: Interchangeable auxiliary equipment
 EN 16247: Energy audits
 EN 16404: Railway applications — Re-railing and recovery requirements for railway vehicles
 EN 16725: Railway applications - Track - Restoration and repair of manganese crossings
 EN 16729: Railway applications – Infrastructure – Non-destructive testing on rails in track
 EN 16729-1: Part 1: Requirements for ultrasonic inspection and evaluation principles
 EN 16729-2: Part 2: Eddy current testing of rails in track
 EN 16729-3: Part 3: Requirements for identifying internal and surface rail defects
 EN 16729-4: Part 4: Qualification of personnel for non-destructive testing on rails
 EN 16804: Diving equipment - Diving open heel fins - Requirements and test methods
 EN 16805: Diving equipment - Diving mask - Requirements and test methods
EN 16931-1: Electronic Invoicing - Semantic data model of the core elements of an electronic invoice
 EN 17161: Design for All - Accessibility following a Design for All approach in products, goods and services - Extending the range of users
 EN 17397: Railway applications - Rail defects
 EN 17397-1: Part 1: Rail defect management

EN 20000–49999
 EN 20345: Personal Protective Equipment – Safety Footwear
 EN 28601: Data elements and interchange formats; information interchange; representation of dates and times
EN 45011: General requirements for bodies operating product certification systems, replaced in 2012 by ISO/IEC 17065 Conformity assessment: Requirements for bodies certifying products, processes and services.
 EN 45502-1: Active implantable medical devices - Part 1: General requirements for safety, marking and information to be provided by the manufacturer
 EN 45545: Railway applications. Fire protection on railway vehicles.
 EN 45545-1: Railway applications. Fire protection on railway vehicles. General
 EN 45545-2: Railway applications. Fire protection on railway vehicles. Requirements for fire behaviour of materials and components
 EN 45545-3: Railway applications. Fire protection on railway vehicles. Fire resistance requirements for fire barriers
 EN 45545-4: Railway applications. Fire protection on railway vehicles. Fire safety requirements for rolling stock design
 EN 45545-5: Railway applications. Fire protection on railway vehicles. Fire safety requirements for electrical equipment including that of trolley buses, track guided buses and magnetic levitation vehicles
 EN 45545-6: Railway applications. Fire protection on railway vehicles. Fire control and management systems
 EN 45545-7: Railway applications. Fire protection on railway vehicles. Fire safety requirements for flammable liquid and flammable gas installations
 EN 45554: General methods for the assessment of the ability to repair, reuse and upgrade energy-related products

EN 50000–59999 (CEN specific, non-IEC electrical standards) 
 EN 50022: 35 mm snap-on top-hat mounting rails for low-voltage switchgear (DIN rail)
 EN 50075: Europlug
 EN 50090: Home and Building Electronic Systems (KNX/EIB)
 EN 50102: Degrees of protection provided by enclosures for electrical equipment against external mechanical impacts
 EN 50119: Railway applications - Fixed installations: Electric traction overhead contact lines for railways
 EN 50121: Railway applications - Electromagnetic compatibility
 EN 50121-1: Railway applications - Electromagnetic compatibility Part 1: General 
 EN 50121-2:  Railway applications - Electromagnetic compatibility - Part 2 : emission of the whole railway system to the outside world 
 EN 50121-3-1: Railway applications - Electromagnetic compatibility - Part 3-1 : rolling stock - Train and complete vehicle 
 EN 50121-3-2: Railway applications - Electromagnetic compatibility - Part 3-2 : rolling stock - Apparatus 
 EN 50121-4:  Railway applications - Electromagnetic compatibility - Part 4 : emission and immunity of the signaling and telecommunications apparatus 
 EN 50121-5: Railway applications - Electromagnetic compatibility - Part 5: Emission and immunity of fixed power supply installations and apparatus
 EN 50122: Railway applications - Fixed installations
 EN 50122-1: Railway applications - Fixed installations - Electrical safety, earthing and the return circuit - Part 1: Protective provisions against electric shock
 EN 50122-2: Railway applications - Fixed installations - Part 2: Protective provisions against the effects of Stray currents caused by d.c. traction systems
 EN 50122-3: Railway applications - Fixed installations - Electrical safety, earthing and the return circuit - Part 3: Mutual Interaction of a.c. and d.c. traction systems 
 EN 50123: Railway applications - Fixed installations - D.C. switchgear
 EN 50124: Railway applications - Insulation coordination
 EN 50125-1: Railway applications - Environmental conditions for equipment - Part 1: Rolling stock and on-board equipment
 EN 50125-2: Railway applications - Environmental conditions for equipment - Part 2: Fixed electrical installations
 EN 50125-3: Railway applications - Environmental conditions for equipment - Part 3: Equipment for signaling and telecommunications    
 EN 50126: Railway applications - The specification and demonstration of reliability, availability, maintainability and safety (RAMS)
 EN 50128: Railway applications - Communication, signalling and processing systems - Software for railway control and protection systems 
 EN 50129: Railway applications - Communication, signalling and processing systems – Safety related electronic systems for signalling
 EN 50130: Alarm systems - Electromagnetic compatibility and Environmental test methods
 EN 50131: Alarm systems - Intrusion and hold-up systems
 EN 50136: Alarm systems - Alarm transmission systems
 EN 50153: Railway applications - Rolling stock - Protective provisions relating to electrical hazards
 EN 50155: Railway applications - Electronic equipment used on rolling stock 
 EN 50157: Domestic and Similar Electronic Equipment Interconnection Requirements (Part1 = AV.link)
 EN 50159: Railway applications - Communication, signaling and processing systems - Safety-related communication in transmission systems
 EN 50163: Railway applications - Supply voltages of traction systems
 EN 50178: Electronic equipment for use in power installations
 EN 50262: Metric cable glands
 EN 50267: Corrosive Gases
 EN 50272-1: Standards for Safety requirements for secondary batteries and battery installations - Part 1 General safety information
 EN 50272-2: Standards for Safety requirements for secondary batteries and battery installations - Part 2 Stationary batteries
 EN 50522: Earthing of power installations exceeding 1 kV a.c.
 EN 50308: Wind Turbines - Protective Measures - Requirements for design, operation and maintenance
 EN 50325: Industrial communications subsystem based on ISO 11898 (CAN) for controller-device interfaces
 EN 50412: Power line communication apparatus and systems used in low-voltage installations in the frequency range 1.6 MHz to 30 MHz
 EN 50436: Alcohol interlocks
 EN 50465: Gas appliances - Combined heat and power appliance of nominal heat input inferior or equal to 70 kW
 EN 50525: Low voltage energy cables; a merger of HD 21 and HD 22.
 EN 50571: Household and similar electrical appliances - Safety - Particular requirements for commercial electric washing machines
EN 50581: documentation for the assessment of electrical and electronic products with respect to the RoHS
 EN 50600: Information technology - Data centre facilities and infrastructures
 EN 50632: Electric motor-operated tools - Dust measurement Procedure
 EN 50657: Railways Applications - Rolling stock applications - Software on Board Rolling Stock
 EN 55014: Electromagnetic compatibility — Requirements for household appliances, electric tools and similar apparatus
 EN 55022: Information technology equipment. Radio disturbance characteristics.
 EN 55024: Information technology equipment. Immunity characteristics.
 EN 55032: Electromagnetic Compatibility of Multimedia Equipment. Emission requirements.
 EN 55035: Electromagnetic Compatibility of Multimedia Equipment. Immunity requirements.

EN 60000-69999 (CEN editions of IEC standards)

 EN 60065: Audio, Video and similar electronics apparatus - Safety requirements.
 EN 60950-1: Information technology equipment - Safety - Part1: General requirements
 EN 60950-21: Information technology equipment - Safety - Part21: Remote power feeding
 EN 60950-22: Information technology equipment - Safety - Part22: Equipment installed outdoors
 EN 60950-23: Information technology equipment - Safety - Part23: Large data storage equipment
 EN 61000-1-2: Electromagnetic compatibility (EMC). General. Methodology for the achievement of functional safety of electrical and electronic systems including equipment with regard to electromagnetic phenomena
 EN 61000-1-3: Electromagnetic compatibility (EMC). General. The effects of high-altitude EMP (HEMP) on civil equipment and systems
 EN 61000-1-4: Electromagnetic compatibility (EMC). General. Historical rationale for the limitation of power-frequency conducted harmonic current emissions from equipment, in the frequency range up to 2 kHz
 EN 61000-1-5: Electromagnetic compatibility (EMC). General. High power electromagnetic (HPEM) effects on civil systems
 EN 61000-1-6: Electromagnetic compatibility (EMC). General. Guide to the assessment of measurement uncertainty
 EN 61000-2-2: Electromagnetic compatibility (EMC). Environment. Compatibility levels for low-frequency conducted disturbances and signaling in public low-voltage power supply systems
 EN 61000-2-4: Electromagnetic compatibility (EMC). Environment. Compatibility levels in industrial plants for low-frequency conducted disturbances
 EN 61000-2-9: Electromagnetic compatibility (EMC). Environment. Description of HEMP environment. Radiated disturbance. Basic EMC publication
 EN 61000-2-10: Electromagnetic compatibility (EMC). Environment. Description of HEMP environment. Conducted disturbance
 EN 61000-2-12: Electromagnetic compatibility (EMC). Environment. Compatibility levels for low-frequency conducted disturbances and signaling in public medium-voltage power supply systems
 EN 61000-3-2: Electromagnetic compatibility (EMC). Limits. Limits for harmonic current emissions (equipment input current up to and including 16 A per phase)
 EN 61000-3-3: Electromagnetic compatibility (EMC). Limits. Limitation of voltage changes, voltage fluctuations and flicker in public low-voltage supply systems, for equipment with rated current ≤ 16 A per phase and not subject to conditional connection
 EN 61000-3-11: Electromagnetic compatibility (EMC). Limits. Limitation of voltage changes, voltage fluctuations and flicker in public low-voltage supply systems. Equipment with rated voltage current ≤ 75 A and subject to conditional connection
 EN 61000-3-12: Electromagnetic compatibility (EMC). Limits.
 EN 61000-4-1: Electromagnetic compatibility (EMC). Testing and measurement techniques. Overview of IEC 61000-4 series
 EN 61000-4-2: Electromagnetic compatibility (EMC). Testing and measurement techniques. Electrostatic discharge immunity test. Basic EMC publication
 EN 61000-4-3: Electromagnetic compatibility (EMC). Testing and measurement techniques. Radiated, radio-frequency, electromagnetic field immunity test
 EN 61000-4-4: Electromagnetic compatibility (EMC). Testing and measurement techniques. Electrical fast transient/burst immunity test
 EN 61000-4-5: Electromagnetic compatibility (EMC). Testing and measurement techniques. Surge immunity test
 EN 61000-4-6: Electromagnetic compatibility (EMC). Testing and measurement techniques. Immunity to conducted disturbances, induced by radio-frequency fields
 EN 61000-4-7: Electromagnetic compatibility (EMC). Testing and measurement techniques. General guide on harmonics and interharmonics measurements and instrumentation, for power supply systems and equipment connected thereto 
 EN 61000-4-8: Electromagnetic compatibility (EMC). Testing and measurement techniques. Power frequency magnetic field immunity test. Basic EMC publication
 EN 61000-4-11: Electromagnetic compatibility (EMC). Testing and measurement techniques. Voltage dips, short interruptions and voltage variations immunity tests
 EN 61000-4-12: Electromagnetic compatibility (EMC). Testing and measurement techniques. Oscillatory waves immunity test. Basic EMC publication
 EN 61000-4-13: Electromagnetic compatibility (EMC). Testing and measurement techniques. Harmonics and interharmonics including mains signaling at a.c. power port, low frequency immunity tests
 EN 61000-4-14: Electromagnetic compatibility (EMC). Testing and measurement techniques. Voltage fluctuation immunity test for equipment with input current not exceeding 16 A per phase
 EN 61000-4-15: Electromagnetic compatibility (EMC). Testing and measurement techniques. Flickermeter. Functional and design specifications. Basic EMC publication
 EN 61000-4-16: Electromagnetic compatibility (EMC). Testing and measurement techniques. Test for immunity to conducted, common mode disturbances in the frequency range 0 Hz to 150 kHz
 EN 61000-4-17: Electromagnetic compatibility (EMC). Testing and measurement techniques. Ripple on d.c. input power port immunity test
 EN 61000-4-18: Electromagnetic compatibility (EMC). Testing and measurement techniques. Damped oscillatory wave immunity test
 EN 61000-4-19: Electromagnetic compatibility (EMC). Testing and measurement techniques. Test for immunity to conducted, differential mode disturbances and signaling in the frequency range 2 kHz to 150 kHz at a.c. power ports
 EN 61000-4-20: Electromagnetic compatibility (EMC). Testing and measurement techniques. Emission and immunity testing in transverse electromagnetic (TEM) waveguides
 EN 61000-4-21: Electromagnetic compatibility (EMC). Testing and measurement techniques. Reverberation chamber test methods
 EN 61000-4-22: Electromagnetic compatibility (EMC). Testing and measurement techniques. Radiated emission and immunity measurements in fully anechoic rooms (FARs)
 EN 61000-4-23: Electromagnetic compatibility (EMC). Testing and measurement techniques. Test methods for protective devices for HEMP and other radiated disturbances
 EN 61000-4-24: Electromagnetic compatibility (EMC). Testing and measurement techniques. Test methods for protective devices for HEMP conducted disturbance. Basic EMC publication
 EN 61000-4-25: Electromagnetic compatibility (EMC). Testing and measurement techniques. HEMP immunity test methods for equipment and systems
 EN 61000-4-27: Electromagnetic compatibility (EMC). Testing and measurement techniques. Unbalance, immunity test for equipment with input current not exceeding 16 A per phase
 EN 61000-4-28: Electromagnetic compatibility (EMC). Testing and measurement techniques. Variation of power frequency, immunity test for equipment with input current not exceeding 16 A per phase
 EN 61000-4-29: Electromagnetic compatibility (EMC). Testing and measurement techniques. Voltage dips, short interruptions and voltage variations on d.c.input power ports. Immunity tests. Basic EMC Publication.
 EN 61000-4-30: Electromagnetic compatibility (EMC). Testing and measurement techniques. Testing and measurement techniques. Power quality measurement methods
 EN 61000-4-34: Electromagnetic compatibility (EMC). Testing and measurement techniques. Voltage dips, short interruptions and voltage variations immunity tests for equipment with mains current more than 16 A per phase
 IEC 61000-5-1 Electromagnetic compatibility (EMC). Installation and mitigation guidelines. General considerations. Basic EMC publication
 EN 61000-5-5 Electromagnetic compatibility (EMC). Installation and mitigation guidelines. Specification of protective devices for HEMP conducted disturbance. Basic EMC publication
 EN 61000-5-7 Electromagnetic compatibility (EMC). Installation and mitigation guidelines. Degrees of protection by enclosures against electromagnetic disturbances (EM code). Degrees of protection against electromagnetic disturbances provided by enclosures (EM code)
 EN 61000-6-1 Electromagnetic compatibility (EMC). Generic standards. Immunity for residential, commercial and light-industrial environments
 EN 61000-6-2 Electromagnetic compatibility (EMC). Generic standards. Immunity for industrial environments
 EN 61000-6-3 Electromagnetic compatibility (EMC). Generic standards. Emission standard for residential, commercial and light-industrial environments
 EN 61000-6-4 Electromagnetic compatibility (EMC). Generic standards. Emission standard for industrial environments
 EN 62061 /IEC 62061 Safety of machinery: Functional safety of electrical, electronic and programmable electronic control systems
 EN 62353:2014 Medical electrical equipment. Recurrent test and test after repair of medical electrical equipment 
 EN 62366 Medical devices - Application of usability engineering to medical devices

Moreover, there are a lot of ISO and IEC standards that were accepted as "European Standard" (headlined as EN ISO xxxxx) and are valid in the European Economic Region.

See also 
 Institute for Reference Materials and Measurements (IRMM)
 List of ASTM International standards (D5001-6000)
 List of ASTM International standards (D6001-7000)
 List of DIN standards
 List of ISO standards

References

External links

 
EN standards
European Standard